Patty Fendick and Ann Henricksson were the defending doubles tennis champions at the 1989 Taipei Women's Championship, but only Henricksson competed that year, with Beth Herr. They lost in the first round to Cecilia Dahlman and Nana Miyagi.

Maria Lindström and Heather Ludloff won the final 4–6, 7–5, 6–3 against Dahlman and Miyagi.

Seeds
Champion seeds are indicated in bold text while text in italics indicates the round in which those seeds were eliminated.

 Ann Henricksson /  Beth Herr (first round)
 Lea Antonoplis /  Cammy MacGregor (semifinals)
n/a
 Maria Lindström /  Heather Ludloff (champions)

Draw

External links
 1989 Taipei Women's Championship Doubles draw sheet at ITFTennis.com

1989 Doubles
1989 WTA Tour
1989 in Taiwanese tennis